Sound of Change is the fourth studio album by reggae/rock/rap hybrid band the Dirty Heads. The album was released on July 8, 2014.

Reception

The album debuted at No. 8 on the Billboard 200, and No. 2 on Top Rock Albums chart, selling around 21,000 copies in its first week. The album has sold 83,000 copies in the United States as of June 2016.

The album was a departure from the hip-hop reggae sound the band was known for, in favor of pop music.

Track listing

Charts

References 

2014 albums
Dirty Heads albums
Five Seven Music albums